The Screaming Jets is a self-titled, third studio album released by the Australian rock band The Screaming Jets. The album was released in August 1995 and debuted and peaked at number 5 on the ARIA charts and was certified gold.

Reviews
Jonathan Lewis of AllMusic gave the album 4 out 5 saying; "It's no coincidence that The Screaming Jets chose to self-title their third album. For The Screaming Jets, the band changed their approach somewhat, introducing more thoughtful lyrics and toning down the metal aspect of their music. The change is a good one, and this is a much more mature effort from the band. As a group they are tighter than ever and the quality of their songwriting has improved noticeably from their two previous outings. But changing a successful formula, regardless of how good a change it is, is always going to alienate fans. The Screaming Jets failed to live up to the success of its predecessor but [is] Screaming Jets' best. "

Track listing

Charts

Certifications

Band members
Dave Gleeson – vocals 
Paul Woseen – bass guitar, backing vocals 
Jimi "The Human" Hocking – guitar 
Craig Rosevear – drums
Grant Walmsley – guitar, backing vocals

References

The Screaming Jets albums
1995 albums